Bettina Lerner (born 7 August 1957) is a television producer, and a former Series Editor of the BBC science series Horizon.

Early life
Her background is in anthropology.

Career

BBC
Bettina Lerner was lead researcher for the BBC series The Day the Universe Changed, which was first broadcast in 1985.

She was deputy series editor of Horizon from 1998 to 1999, becoming series editor in 1999. She has written and produced for the series as well. Around 18 documentaries a year would be made for the series.

In July 1998, she won an annual award (for television) from the Association of British Science Writers (ABSW).

In 2002, she won the BAFTA (Television) factual series award for Horizon.

Personal life
She lives in west London.

References

External links
 
 Atomium Films
Bettina Lerner on BFI

1957 births
BBC television producers
Horizon (British TV series)
Living people